The 2015–16 OGC Nice season was the 111th professional season of the club since its creation in 1904.

Players

First team squad

Out on loan

Transfers

Transfers in

Loans in

Transfers out

Loans out

Pre-season & friendlies

Competitions

Ligue 1

League table

Results summary

Results by round

Matches

Coupe de la Ligue

Coupe de France

Goalscorers
Last updated 12 March 2016

References

Nice
OGC Nice seasons